Hovsep is Armenian for Joseph. Notable people with the name include:

 Hovsep Pushman, American artist
 Hovsep Kirakosyan, Armenian military officer
 Hovsep Arghutian
 Hovsep Aznavur
 Hovsep Orbeli
 Hovsep Emin
 Hovsep Vartanian

Armenian masculine given names